The Minpu Bridge is a double-decker cable-stayed bridge over the Huangpu River in Minhang District, Shanghai, China. It opened to traffic on 11 January 2010.

The bridge was designed by the Shanghai Municipal Engineering Design Institute, Shanghai Urban Construction College, and Shanghai Urban Construction Design Institute, with assistance from Holger S. Svensson. It was built by the Shanghai Huangpujiang Bridge Engineering Construction Company. It carries two levels of roadway to accommodate more cars and has a stiffening truss to prevent swinging in the city's harsh winds.

References

Bridges in Shanghai
Cable-stayed bridges in China
Toll bridges in China